Craig Harry Moore (born 21 September 2005) is a Scottish professional footballer who plays for Dundee United.

Club career 
Craig Moore made his professional debut for Dundee United on 18 December 2021, starting in the 1–0 away Scottish Premiership loss to Rangers, the reigning champions. Having celebrated his sixteenth birthday only a few months before, he became the youngest ever footballer to start a competitive match for United, surpassing John Souttar's previous record.

International career 
Moore is a youth international for Scotland, having played with the county's under-17.

Personal life 
Craig is the brother of fellow footballer, and former Dundee player, Callum Moore.

References

External links

Dundee United profile

2005 births
Living people
Scottish footballers
Scotland youth international footballers
Association football midfielders
Footballers from Dundee
Dundee United F.C. players
Scottish Professional Football League players